Fred Taylor (1877 – after 1897) was an English professional footballer who played as a wing half.

References

1877 births
Footballers from Grimsby
English footballers
Association football wing halves
Grimsby All Saints F.C. players
Grimsby Town F.C. players
English Football League players
Year of death missing